Daphnella capensis is a species of sea snail, a marine gastropod mollusk in the family Raphitomidae.

Not to be confused with Daphnella capensis (E. A. Smith, 1882), a synonym of Tritonoturris capensis (E. A. Smith, 1882).

Description
The length of the shell attains 10 mm, its diameter 5 mm.

The small, white shell has a fusiform shape. The spire is acute with a papillary apex. The shell contains 5½ slightly convex whorls with many longitudinal ribs crossed by narrow spiral lirations. The body whorl is inflated. The columella is slightly twisted and not callous. The aperture is wide. The sharp outer lip is arcuate.

Distribution
This marine species occurs off Port Elizabeth, South Africa.

References

 Bartsch, P. 1915. Bull. U.S. Nat. Mus. 91: 32, plate 8, figure 3.
 Kilburn R.N. & Marais J.P. (2010) Columbellidae. pp. 60–104, in: Marais A.P. & Seccombe A.D. (eds), Identification guide to the seashells of South Africa. Volume 1. Groenkloof: Centre for Molluscan Studies. 376 pp.

External links

capensis
Gastropods described in 1892